Norah Jones is an American singer, songwriter, and pianist of Anglo-American and Bengali descent. She is the daughter of Indian sitar player Ravi Shankar and half-sister of sitarist Anoushka Shankar. Jones' career was launched with her 2002 debut album Come Away with Me, a contemporary pop album that sold over twenty million copies worldwide. Her second album Feels like Home was released in 2004 with more than a million sales in the first week of its United States release. In 2007, she released her third album Not Too Late which debuted at number one on several national music charts. She has become one of the most successful recording artists of the decade, with sales of more than 17 million units in the United States and 39 million units worldwide.

She has been the recipient of several Grammy Awards; Come Away with Me was nominated for three awards at the 45th Grammy Awards. Jones personally received five of the eight awards for Come Away with Me. She also received three awards at the 47th Grammy Awards, including "Record of the Year" and "Best Pop Collaboration with Vocals" for her work with Ray Charles on the song "Here We Go Again". She received her eighth Grammy for "Best Female Pop Vocal Performance" for her song "Sunrise". Overall, Jones has received 14 awards from 44 nominations.

Abilu Music Awards

!Ref.
|-
| style="text-align:center;"|2016
| Day Breaks
| International Jazz Album of the Year
| 
|

American Music Awards
The American Music Awards are awarded for outstanding achievements in the record industry. Jones has received seven nominations.

|-
| style="text-align:center;" rowspan="2"| 2003(November) || Norah Jones || Favorite Adult Contemporary Artist || 
|-
| Come Away With Me || Favorite Pop/Rock Album || 
|-
| style="text-align:center;" rowspan="3"| 2004 ||rowspan="2"| Norah Jones || Artist of the Year || 
|-
| Favorite Adult Contemporary Artist || 
|-
| Feels Like Home || Favorite Pop/Rock Album || 
|-
| style="text-align:center;" rowspan="2"| 2007 ||rowspan="2"| Norah Jones || Artist of the Year || 
|-
| Favorite Adult Contemporary Artist ||

Billboard Music Awards
The Billboard Music Awards are sponsored by Billboard magazine and is held annually in December. Jones has received eight nominations.

|-
|rowspan="2" style="text-align:center;"|2003
| style="text-align:center;"| Come Away With Me || Top Internet Album || 
|-
| style="text-align:center;"| Norah Jones || Top Billboard 200 Album Artist - Female || 
|-
| rowspan="6" style="text-align:center;"| 2004 
|rowspan="4" style="text-align:center;"| Norah Jones || Top Billboard 200 Album Artist - Female || 
|-
| Top Internet Album Artist || 
|-
| Female Artist of the Year || 
|-
| Top Billboard 200 Album Artist || 
|-
|rowspan="2" style="text-align:center;"| Feels Like Home || Top Internet Album || 
|-
| Top Billboard 200 Album || 	

Billboard Japan Music Awards

Brit Awards
The Brit Awards are the British Phonographic Industry's annual pop music awards. Jones has received four nominations.

|-
|rowspan="3"| 2003 || Come Away With Me || International Album || 
|-
|rowspan="2"| Norah Jones || International Breakthrough Act || 
|-
| International Female Solo Artist || 
|-
| 2010 || Norah Jones || International Female Solo Artist ||

GAFFA Awards

Denmark GAFFA Awards
Delivered since 1991, the GAFFA Awards are a Danish award that rewards popular music by the magazine of the same name.

!
|-
| 2002
| Herself
| Best Foreign New Act
| 
| style="text-align:center;" |
|-
|}

Grammy Awards
The Grammy Awards are awarded annually by the National Academy of Recording Arts and Sciences. Jones has received nine awards from seventeen nominations, including Album of the Year (twice), Record of the Year (twice) and Best New Artist.

|-
| rowspan="5" |  || Norah Jones || Best New Artist || 
|-
| rowspan="2" | Come Away with Me || Album of the Year || 
|-
|  Best Pop Vocal Album || 
|-
| rowspan="2" | "Don't Know Why" || Record of the Year || 
|-
| Best Female Pop Vocal Performance || 
|-
||  || "Wurlitzer Prize (I Don't Want To Get Over You)" (with Willie Nelson) || Best Country Collaboration with Vocals || 
|-
| rowspan="5" |  || rowspan="2" | "Here We Go Again" (with Ray Charles) || Record of the Year || 
|-
| Best Pop Collaboration with Vocals || 
|-
| "Sunrise" || Best Female Pop Vocal Performance || 
|-
| Feels Like Home || Best Pop Vocal Album || 
|-
| "Creepin' In" (with Dolly Parton) || Best Country Collaboration with Vocals || 
|-
| rowspan="2" |  || "Virginia Moon" (with Foo Fighters) || Best Pop Collaboration with Vocals || 
|-
| "Dreams Come True" (with Willie Nelson) || Best Country Collaboration with Vocals || 
|-
||  || River: The Joni Letters (featured Artist) || Album of the Year || 
|-
||  || "Baby, It's Cold Outside" (with Willie Nelson) || Best Pop Collaboration with Vocals || 
|-
||  || "Chasing Pirates" || Best Female Pop Vocal Performance || 
|-
|| 2021 || "I'll Be Gone" || Best American Roots Performance || 
|-
|| 2022 || 'Till We Meet Again (Live) || Best Traditional Pop Vocal Album || 
|}

Italian Music Awards
The Italian Music Awards were an accolade established in 2001 by the Federazione Industria Musicale Italiana to recognize the achievements in the Italian Music industry both by domestic and international artists.

|-
| rowspan="2" | 2002 || rowspan="2" | Norah Jones || Best International Female Artist || 
|-
| Best International Revelation of the Year || 
|}

Japan Gold Disc Awards
The Japan Gold Disc Awards are an annual ceremony hosted in Japan. The winner are based by sales provided by The Recording Industry Association of Japan (RIAJ).

Juno Awards

MTV Video Music Awards
An MTV Video Music Award (commonly abbreviated as a VMA), is an award presented by the cable channel MTV to honor the best in music videos. Originally conceived as an alternative to the Grammy Awards.

Music Video Production Awards 
The MVPA Awards are annually presented by a Los Angeles-based music trade organization to honor the year's best music videos.

NRJ Music Awards 

|-
| 2004 || Norah Jones || International New Artist of the Year ||

Pop Awards
Pop Magazine is an online music magazine created by Hotspot Entertainment and published by A-Z Publishings. The magazine was launched on April 24, 2014. In 2018, Pop Magazine launched the first annual Pop Awards with 25 nominees across 5 categories.

|-
| 2021
| Herself
| Female Artist of the Year
|

Teen Choice Awards
The Teen Choice Awards is an awards show presented annually by the Fox Broadcasting Company. Jones has received one nomination.

|-
| 2003 || Norah Jones || Choice Female Fashion Icon ||

The Asian Awards
The Asian Awards are the world's only pan-Asian pan-sector awards ceremony.

|-
| 2014 || Norah Jones || Outstanding Achievement in Music ||

World Music Awards
The international World Music Awards honors recording artists based on worldwide sales figures provided by the International Federation of the Phonographic Industry. Jones has received four awards from four nominations.

|-
| rowspan="2" | 2003 || rowspan="2" | Norah Jones || Best Selling Female Pop Artist of the Year || 
|-
| Best Selling Contemporary Artist of the Year || 
|-
| rowspan="2" | 2004 || rowspan="2" | Norah Jones || Best Selling Female Artist of the Year || 
|-
| Best Selling Jazz Artist of the Year ||

Žebřík Music Awards

!Ref.
|-
| 2002
| rowspan=4|Norah Jones
| Best International Surprise
| 
| rowspan=2|
|-
| 2003
| rowspan=3|Best International Female
| 
|-
| 2004
| 
| rowspan=2|
|-
| 2005
|

References

External links
Official website

Lists of awards received by American musician
Awards